Bellissima ("Very Beautiful" in Italian) may refer to:

 Bellissima (film), a 1951 film by Luchino Visconti
 Bellissima!, a 1988 Pizzicato Five album
 "Bellissima" (song), a 1997 DJ Quicksilver song
 MSC Bellissima, a cruise ship
 Trialeurodes bellissima, a whitefly species

See also
Belíssima telenovela